Archbishop Julio E. Murray is the primate of Iglesia Anglicana de la Region Central de America (IARCA), an Anglican Province and a transnational church in the Central America Region, which in turn belongs to the worldwide the Anglican Communion, he was elected in April 2018 and installed in August 2018. He is the current bishop of Panama of the Anglican Diocese of Panama.

Julio Murray studied theology in three Institutions, the Latin American Biblical Seminary Costa Rica, the National University of Heredia, and the American Biblical University Costa Rica. He also attended the Bossey Institute in Switzerland.

As the Diocesan Bishop he presided over the Special Convention in August 2020. He was the vice president of the Anglican Church of the Central Region of Americas 2018.

References 

Anglican bishops of Panama
Anglican archbishops of Central America
Year of birth missing (living people)
Living people